David Horn Johnson (1912–1996) was a zoologist and department head at the Smithsonian Institution's National Museum of Natural History, specialising in the study of mammals.

Johnson completed a Ph.D. at the University of California Berkeley and began working for the museum as curator in 1941. During World War II, he became interested in Asian mammals and went on to research and publish on the topic.

After becoming head of the mammal department of the museum, he participated in the 1948 American-Australian Scientific Expedition to Arnhem Land in the  Northern Territory, Australia. Descriptions of parts of collection, several bats and a marsupial, were later published as new species. He is reported to have been an accomplished bushman, marksman and prepared his own specimens.

References

1912 births
1996 deaths
American mammalogists
20th-century American zoologists
University of California, Berkeley alumni